Sansui railway station is a railway station of Hangchangkun Passenger Railway located in Guizhou, People's Republic of China.

Railway stations in Guizhou